Markova Crkva is a village situated in Lajkovac municipality in Serbia.

Demographics

It is by far the smallest of all settlements in the municipality. Both areawise and populationwise. After the Population Census 2011. it is documented that there are 119 people in Markova Crkva, out of which 111 are permanent residents, while 8 (eight) are outside of the country, chiefly because of their working arrangements in Austria, Switzerland and other places in Europe.

There are 39 occupied households in the village. Additional 32 are vacated for various reasons.

The first information regarding people living in the village was recorded in 1717. when there was one house paying taxes. Less than 20 years after population dramatically increased, thanks to Austrian government (1718-1739) during which there were no persecutions instigated by Muslim Ottomans against Christian Serb people. Yet, in 1739. Austria surrendered the area back to the Ottomans, according to the Treaty of Belgrade, hence the population stagnation for the next one hundred years.

Markova Crkva saw a steady demographic increase after the liberation (1804-1815) all the way to the World War I when it lost considerable number of people, mostly adult, fighting men. The final boom started in the Interbellum, and was briefly stopped because of the World War II, but recuperated again. The final drop in numbers was first recorded 1961. since millions of people from countryside migrated to cities during Yugoslav era. 

Further population loss is a consequence of low birth rates, a pest  typical for whole of the Eastern Europe.

Population changes in the 20th century

References

External links

Populated places in Kolubara District